Willowdale, Nova Scotia could be the following places in Nova Scotia:
Willowdale, Halifax, Nova Scotia
Willowdale, Pictou, Nova Scotia